Daniel David Cherry (born 1980) is a Welsh cricketer. He is a left-handed batsman and a right-arm medium-pace bowler who played for Glamorgan and represented England up to under 17 level.

Cherry debuted for the Glamorgan 2nd XI in 1998 due to a spate of injuries to the Glamorgan team, and subsequently left to read history at Swansea University. He did not appear again until 2002, when he scored a one-day century against Scotland. He struggled to find a consistent place in the first XI in the County Championship and was usually overlooked for one day games, despite his century against Scotland

He was prolific for the 2nd XI in 2004 and fought his way back into the first team in the latter part of the season while a back injury to Matthew Elliott on the morning of Glamorgan's match against Surrey CCC in May 2005 led to his hasty inclusion. He retained his place in the side, scored his maiden first class fifty against Sussex and recorded both his maiden Championship hundred and double-hundred in the 1st innings of Glamorgan's match against Middlesex CCC at Southgate. His score of 226 is the 14th highest in the history of the club, and only eight batsmen have ever made larger scores.

He lost his first team place midway through the 2006 season before returning to the side towards the end of the season. He played in the early matches again in 2007, but failed to command a regular spot and was released from the county's staff to pursue a new career as a crime analyst.

In 40 first class matches he scored 1,824 runs with 3 centuries and a highest score of 226. His overall average was a disappointing 26.05 however and in 22 one day games he scored only 312 runs at 15.60 with a highest score of 42.

Club Cricket 
born 7 February 1980 in Monmouthshire

Since 2005, Cherry has played for Port Talbot Town in the South Wales Cricket Association. To date, he has played 71 matches, scoring 3003 runs at an average of 54.60 including six centuries. He has also taken 25 wickets at an average of 28.60.

During 2006, Cherry made the highest score by a Port Talbot Town player in a 1st team match when he scored 179 not out against Dafen from 167 balls eclipsing the previous record of 150 not out set by Bashir Sharif in 1993. During this innings, he was involved in an unbeaten second wicket partnership of 239 with Dean Cox, an all-time record for the club in a 1st team league match.

In 2008, Cherry and former Glamorgan colleague Ian Thomas (122 not out) shared an unbeaten opening partnership of 206 to defeat Briton Ferry Steel by 10 wickets at The New Mansel ground, Cherry contributing 72 not out.

Cherry was appointed club captain for the 2009 season and responded by amassing a club record 704 runs from 14 innings at an average of 64 again surpassing Bashir Sharif who had scored 692 runs during the 1991 campaign. This included six half centuries and 101 at Pontarddulais. Cherry's prolific form was instrumental in Port Talbot securing fifth place in the 1st Division of the South Wales Cricket Association thus gaining qualification to the inaugural South Wales Premier League for the 2010 season.

2010 season

His prolific form continued unabated during the campaign. Leading a side that was tipped by many to be relegation certainties, Port Talbot recovered from a difficult start with their captain once again playing a leading role. His value to his side was never better illustrated than his unbeaten 114 against Usk at The New Mansel out of a score of 209/8. This maiden century on his home ground helped Port Talbot gain their first Premier League victory.

Cherry featured in another piece of history later in the season when against Swansea at The New Mansel, he and Mark Wallace shared an unbroken partnership of 323 for the 3rd wicket, a record stand for any wicket in the club's history. The Glamorgan wicketkeeper made a breathtaking 216 not out from just 145 balls with 16 fours and 13 sixes while Cherry contributed a more sedate unbeaten 115 from 114 balls with 12 fours and two sixes.

Under Cherry's inspired captaincy, Port Talbot climbed steadily up the table during the second half of the season and eventually finished in fourth position with Cherry contributing an impressive haul of 593 runs at an average of 59.30 from 14 matches including four half centuries and two hundreds.

References 
Cricinfo profile
Cricket Archive 

1980 births
Living people
Welsh cricketers
Glamorgan cricketers
Sportspeople from Newport, Wales
Wales National County cricketers